Major League Baseball has various records related to doubles.

Players denoted in boldface  are still actively contributing to the record noted.
(r) denotes a player's rookie season.

600 career doubles
(Through August 10, 2022)

Top 10 career doubles by league

Doubles in one season

Evolution of the single-season record for doubles

Lajoie's 1901 through Speaker's 1912 records are listed because some baseball historians and publications disregard any record set prior to the "Modern Era" which started in 1901.

Multiple seasons with 50 doubles

Multiple seasons with 40 doubles

League leader in doubles, 5 or more seasons

League leader in doubles, 3 or more consecutive seasons

League leader in doubles, both leagues

League leader in doubles, three different teams

Four doubles by an individual in one game

This record is held by over 50 players. The most recent to be credited with 4 doubles in one game was Kevin Newman of the Pittsburgh Pirates on August 14, 2021 in a game against the Milwaukee Brewers.

Players who have hit 4 doubles in a game twice
Two players have twice achieved the feat of hitting four doubles in a game:

350 doubles by a team in one season

References

See also

Baseball statistics
 20–20–20 club
 List of Major League Baseball career doubles leaders
 List of Major League Baseball annual doubles leaders

Doubles
Doubles r